Kevin José Rodríguez Cortez (born 4 March 2000) is an Ecuadoran footballer who plays as a forward for Independiente del Valle.

Club career

Imbabura
Born in Ibarra, Rodríguez joined hometown side Imbabura at the age of 13. He progressed through the youth setup until making his first team debut in 2017, featuring in two matches as his club was relegated from the Serie B.

Rodríguez started to feature more regularly in 2018, scoring seven times in the national stage of the Segunda Categoria. After scoring 11 goals overall during the 2019 season, he only scored once in five matches in 2020. In 2021, he only scored twice as his side returned to the second level.

Rodríguez became a regular starter for Imbabura in the 2022 Serie B, scoring ten times as his side finished fifth. In the 2022 Copa Ecuador, he notably scored the winner to knock out LDU Quito in the round of 16.

Independiente del Valle
On 2 December 2022, Independiente del Valle announced the signing of Rodríguez.

International career
Rodríguez was called up to the Ecuador national team for the first time in November 2022, as part of a preparation match against Iraq ahead of the 2022 FIFA World Cup later that month. He made his debut in the match, which finished as a 0–0 draw, coming on as a substitute in the 63rd minute for José Cifuentes. Two days later, he was included by coach Gustavo Alfaro in Ecuador's squad for the World Cup.

Career statistics

Club

International

References

External links
 
 

2000 births
Living people
People from Ibarra, Ecuador
Ecuadorian footballers
Ecuador international footballers
Association football forwards
Imbabura S.C. footballers
Ecuadorian Serie B players
Segunda Categoría players
2022 FIFA World Cup players
C.S.D. Independiente del Valle footballers